Patty Fendick was the defending champion and won in the final 6–2, 6–0 against Belinda Cordwell.

Seeds
A champion seed is indicated in bold text while text in italics indicates the round in which that seed was eliminated.

  Patty Fendick (champion)
  Gretchen Magers (second round)
  Conchita Martínez (quarterfinals)
  Halle Cioffi (second round)
  Sandra Wasserman (second round)
  Belinda Cordwell (final)
  Jo Durie (semifinals)
  Beverly Bowes (quarterfinals)

Draw

External links
 ITF tournament edition details
 WTA tournament draws

WTA Auckland Open
1989 WTA Tour